Buyerak-Senyutkin is a rural locality (a khutor) in Buyerak-Popovskoye Rural Settlement, Serafimovichsky District, Volgograd Oblast, Russia. The population was 134 as of 2010. There are 3 streets.

Geography 
Buyerak-Senyutkin is located 16 km southwest of Serafimovich (the district's administrative centre) by road. Buyerak-Popovsky is the nearest rural locality.

References 

Rural localities in Serafimovichsky District